Thomas Jeffrey Toth (born May 23, 1962) is a former American football offensive lineman who played five seasons in the National Football League with the Miami Dolphins and San Diego Chargers. He was drafted by the New England Patriots in the fourth round of the 1985 NFL Draft. He played college football at Western Michigan University and attended Carl Sandburg High School in Orland Park, Illinois.

References

External links
Just Sports Stats

Living people
1962 births
Players of American football from Illinois
American football offensive linemen
African-American players of American football
Western Michigan Broncos football players
Miami Dolphins players
San Diego Chargers players
People from Blue Island, Illinois
21st-century African-American people
20th-century African-American sportspeople